Docx may refer to:

 A file format, especially for Office Open XML documents
 Edward Docx (born 1972), British writer 
 Mieke Docx (born 1996), Belgian cyclist